The first season of the television series Xena: Warrior Princess commenced airing in the United States and Canada on September 4, 1995, concluded on  July 29, 1996, and contained 24 episodes. It introduces Gabrielle (Renee O'Connor), the series co-star, beside Xena (Lucy Lawless), previously a secondary character in the TV series Hercules: The Legendary Journeys. Gabrielle becomes Xena's greatest ally; her initial naiveté helps to balance Xena and assists her in recognizing and pursuing the "greater good."

The first season aired in the United States in syndication; reruns later ran on the USA Network. The season was released on DVD as a seven disc boxed set under the title of Xena: Warrior Princess: The Complete First Season on April 23, 2003 by Anchor Bay Entertainment.

Production

Crew 
The season was produced by Pacific Renaissance Pictures in partnership with Universal Studios and was aired in first-run syndication in the U.S. The executive producers were Robert Tapert (series creator), with Sam Raimi and R. J. Stewart. The main staff writers were Tapert, Stewart and many others, as Steven L. Sears (co-executive producers), Terence Winter, Peter Allan Fields and Roy Thomas. Some of the first season's episodes were written or co-written by writers on a freelance basis. The regular directors throughout the season were Doug Lefler, Michael Levine, Charles Siebert, Jace Alexander, Josh Becker, John Cameron and Gary Jones. The theme music and opening sequence was composed by Joseph LoDuca.

Cast 
The initial season used many New Zealand natives like Jay Laga'aia in the cast. Willa O'Neill played the sister of Gabrielle, Lila.  Only the name of Lucy Lawless appears in the opening sequence although Renée O'Connor also stars.

Danielle Cormack played Ephiny, an Amazon warrior, and Alison Bruce played Melosa, queen of the Amazons. The main actors of Hercules: The Legendary Journeys, Kevin Sorbo and Michael Hurst, appeared during the season. Robert Trebor played Salmoneus, a friend of Hercules's famous for his "get rich quick" schemes. Kevin Tod Smith portrayed Ares in two episodes and in later seasons. The American actor Bruce Campbell portrayed Autolycus, the king of thieves, a main character in Hercules. Tim Thomerson played Meleager, a friend of Gabrielle and reformed drunk. Karl Urban played the biblic Mael, Karl also played Cupid and Julius Caesar in later seasons. Ted Raimi played Joxer and Hudson Leick played Callisto; both are idols of the series' fandom.

Numerous supporting characters have been given expansive and recurring appearances in the progressive storyline, including: Scott Garrison as Perdicas, Darien Takle as Cyrene, Tom Atkins as Atrius and Leslie Wing as Karis.

Reception 

The pilot episode garnered 4.5 million viewers, ranked in No. 44 in U.S. syndicated rank, behind Hercules: The Legendary Journeys and Star Trek: Deep Space Nine. Based on its strong opening, Robert Tapert produced another 23 episodes of the same style and duration. Season episode No. 12 garnered 6.3 million viewers, and was ranked in No. 13 in U.S. syndicated rank, only behind of Hercules: The Legendary Journeys. The season was down on viewers on its last episode, that garnered 3.9 million viewers, again behind Hercules and Deep Space Nine.

The first season was released in another 27 countries between 1995 and 1996, eventually being seen in 105 countries.

Episodes

Home release 
The DVD release of season one was released by Anchor Bay Entertainment in the U.S. on September 23, 2003 after it had completed broadcast on television. As well as every episode from the season, the DVD release features bonus material including deleted scenes, bloopers and behind-the-scenes featurettes.

References

External links 
 Xena: Warrior Princess Season 1 at Imdb.com

Xena: Warrior Princess seasons
1995 American television seasons
1996 American television seasons